Saihriem or Faihriem may refer to:
 Saihriem people
 Saihriem language

Language and nationality disambiguation pages